Events in the year 1956 in Finland.

Establishments

Eino Leino Prize.
Fagerholm II Cabinet.
Häädetkeidas Strict Nature Reserve.
Käpylän Pallo.
Museum of Finnish Architecture.
Palloiluseura Apollo.
Salon Palloilijat.

Births

19 April - Juhani Himanka.
24 September - Tapio Levo.
20 October - Leo Palin.

 
1950s in Finland
Years of the 20th century in Finland
Finland
Finland